The  Washington Redskins season was the franchise's 21st season in the National Football League (NFL) and their 15th in Washington, D.C.  the team failed to improve on their 5–7 record from 1951 and finished 4-8.

Schedule

Standings

Washington
Washington Redskins seasons
Washington Redskins